Loja, formerly Loxa and fully City of the Immaculate Conception of Loja, is the capital of Ecuador's Loja Province. It is located in the Cuxibamba valley in the south of the country, sharing borders with the provinces of Zamora-Chinchipe and other cantons of the province of Loja. Loja holds a rich tradition in the arts, and for this reason is known as the Music and Cultural Capital of Ecuador. The city is home to two major universities.

The city has a population of about 181,000, and is situated 2060 m (6758 ft) above sea level. It has a mild Andean climate, ranging between 16 and 30 °C.

The Pan-American Highway runs past Loja.

History
The city of Loja was colonized by Field Marshal Alonso de Mercadillo in 1548, and it is named for his hometown of Loja in Spain.  Originally located near La Toma in the Catamayo canyon since 1546, the city was relocated to its present location (about 35 km east) after a devastating earthquake and problems with Malaria. At nearly 500 years, it is one of the oldest cities in Ecuador. One of its founding-reasons for the Spanish colonizers was to have a fortified town next to the region of Zaruma, which was in that time rich in gold. It was as well a departure point for the Amazon Basin to search for the mystic town of El Dorado. The city was also visited by Simón Bolívar in his campaign to unite Gran Colombia. It declared its independence from Spain on November 18, 1820.

The city of Loja has the distinction of being the first city in Ecuador to be wired for electric power provided by a hydroelectric dam that was completed in the 1890s.

Geography
Loja is in the bottom of the broad glacial Cuxibamba valley.  It lies between the humid Amazon Basin and the Peruvian sechura, and is composed mainly of paramo, cloud-forest, and jungle.  The valley borders the Podocarpus National Park, which is a massive cloud-forest reserve accessible through the Cajanuma gates just minutes outside the city.  The Rio Zamora and Rio Malacatos flow through the city of Loja.

Climate
Loja has a mild Andean climate, generally warm during the days and colder and often wetter at night. June and July brings an eastern drizzle with the trade winds, and is referred to as the "windy season." Due to its valley location, the city is often misty in the morning with general absence of sunshine, clearing off towards the afternoon.

Economy

Loja is the capital of one of Ecuador's main coffee-growing provinces.
 
Close to the city of Loja, the first wind power station of Ecuador is located with a visitors center and 11 generators.

Arts and culture

There is a thriving musical scene in Loja, in keeping with the city's reputation.  There are numerous small music and salsa clubs, and it is not uncommon to hear Lojanos singing as they go about their day.  On Sundays, the local police band performs in the Plaza de Independencia outside of San Sebastian Church.

The city is full of public artworks, including massive painted tile murals, frescoes, and statuary.  Of particular note are the frescoes of Bolívar and Sucre that greet visitors as they pass through the gates of the city.

Annual cultural events
 May 30 - August 15 - Pilgirmage of the Virgin of El Cisne
 June 25 - Foundation of Loja Province
 September 1–15 - Ecuador-Peru Border Integration Fair
 November 1 - Return of the Virgin of Cisne to the town of El Cisne
 November 18 - Independence of Loja
 December 8 - Foundation of Loja

Points of interest

 Puerta de la Ciudad
The gates of the city are modeled after the Coat of Arms of the city, presented by King Felipe II of Spain in 1571.  The gate is on Av. Gran Colombia, and houses four galleries which show contemporary Lojano artwork, and a cafeteria and gift shop.
Loja contains a number of historic churches; the city's board of tourism has approached finding them in a novel manner. Beginning at the Puerta de la Ciudad, one of the first thing a tourist will notice is a large orange stripe painted on the sidewalk.  Following the stripe takes the interested on a self-guided tour of the main historic churches and areas of Loja.
 Cathedral
The main Cathedral, built in the colonial style, is located on the central square.  It is home for six months of the year to the Virgin of Cisne, whose statue is carried on the backs of the faithful to and from the town of Cisne, 45 km north of Loja.  The procession shuts the road to traffic twice a year, and it is a mark of pride among Lojanos to participate.  Original adobe in the cathedral building dates from the 16th century; the current building dates from 1838 (previous edifices were lost to earthquakes). The Cathedral is one of the largest churches in Ecuador.  It is the seat of the Roman Catholic Diocese of Loja.
 Church of San Francisco
The small Church of San Francisco houses the city's Franciscan convent.  The church was built in 1548 and then rebuilt in 1851.  The plaza, located on the corner of Av. Bolivar and Av. Colon, features a monument to Alonso de Mercadillo, founder of the city.
 Church of Santo Domingo
The Church of Santo Domingo was built in 1557; the entire edifice was once in the Gothic style, but after an earthquake in 1867 only the twin spires remained standing.  The church was refinished in the colonial style, but the spires were left as a reminder of the former facade.  The church was painted and decorated by notable Lojano Fray Enrique Mideros.  In the plaza of the church stands a monument to Manuel Carrión Pinzano, a founder in 1853 of the Federalism movement in Loja.
 Church of San Sebastian
In 1660, the city of Loja was consecrated to St. Sebastian in order to prevent destruction by earthquakes.  The present church dates from 1900.  Perhaps the most notable landmark of Loja stands on the Plaza San Sebastian (also called the Plaza of Independence) - the 32 meter clock tower commemorates the declaration of independence from the Spanish Crown on November 18, 1820.  The tower has four faces with brass bas relief depicting scenes from the city's history.
 Monuments
There are numerous other monuments to famous Lojanos and Ecuadorians.  Central Square contains the monument to Bernardo Valdivieso, the founder of Loja's universities; a monument to Bolívar is housed in a park of the same name to commemorate his visit to Loja in October 1822.  A monument to Pío Jaramillo stands on the south end of the avenue bearing his name, and at the junction of Av. Jaramillo and Av. Carrión stands a monument to Benjamin Carrion.  A monument to Isidro Ayora stands in the roundabout in front of the bus terminal.

Sports
The city is home of Liga de Loja, a major football team that plays in the Ecuadorian professional football league.

Parks and recreation

There are three parks of note inside the city, and a botanical garden just outside the city limits.
 Jipiro
In the north of the city, Jipiro Park covers more than 10 hectares, is home to various native bird species, and is notable for its scale reproductions of historic and cultural buildings.  The park boasts a pagoda, mosque, St. Basil's cathedral, a medieval castle, and many more, as well as a lake for paddle-boating with an island aviary. 
 La Banda Park
Next to Jipiro on the eastern and western shores of the Rio Zamora, is a huge greenspace with a public carting race track, riding trails, an orchid nursery, and the Loja zoo.
 Parque Pucará de Podocarpus 
On a hill called Pucará de Podocarpus, this is a children's park with playground equipment and a beautiful scenic view.  It is located on the city's former drinking water treatment plant.
 Jardín Botánico Reinaldo Espinosa
Across the road from University Park is the botanical garden which is open to the public and the oldest in Ecuador, created in 1949. There are over 800 native and exotic species. It is a living laboratory for scientific research and environmental education. It covers an area of 7 hectares divided into 5 sections for viewing. Most of the trees in this garden are over 40 years old, and the park is one of the world's highest-altitude botanical gardens.
 Parque Universitario de Educación Ambiental y Recreación "Francisco Vivar Castro"
Located opposite the Botanical Gardens about 5 km south of central Loja, the park covers 90 hectares and includes hiking trails, camping areas, and classrooms for environmental education.

Education
Loja has some of the top Universities in Ecuador. The Universidad Técnica Particular de Loja is one of the top 3 in the nation, offering local and distance education in different fields, such as Architecture, Medicine, Communications, Law, Accounting, Engineering, Auditing, Electronics and Telecommunications, Trades, Administration, Humanities, Biology, and many more.

In September 2007, the UTPL adopted an academic model based on the European System of Credit Transfer and Accumulation (ECTS), which assesses the student's workload, in order to achieve the objectives of an academic program which are reflected in learning achievements and acquired competencies. This university has partnership programs with many universities around the world, such as the University of California at San Diego, Berkeley College, University of Frankfurt, Technische Universität München, The Chinese University of Hong Kong, Universidad de Buenos Aires, and many other top universities around the globe. In addition, the U.T.P.L has three international campuses, besides the principal one in Loja, Ecuador. They are located in New York (USA), Madrid (Spain), and Rome (Italy).

Another notable school, in the top 10 in the nation, is the Universidad Nacional de Loja, which offers programs in Law, Aperture Science, Education, Medicine, Veterinary Sciences, Business, Science and Technology, and Fine Arts. The Loja campus of the Universidad Internacional del Ecuador, in partnership with Harvard University, and the International University of Florida, offers Business Engineering, Finance, Marketing, Ecotourism, Foreign Trade, Economics, Law, Industrial Design, and Interior Design.

Transportation
Streets are laid out on a grid system, and named for notable Ecuadorians and city founding dates. Paved walkways frame the two rivers and provide easy access to the north and south through the city. There are several bus lines running in the city, and also many taxis. There is a bus station at the north end of the city, with routes connecting to the rest of Ecuador and into Peru. Loja is served by Ciudad de Catamayo Airport in Catamayo, 30 km away. From there, it is possible to fly to Quito or Guayaquil.

Media
The major newspapers are La Hora, and Cronica http://www.cronica.com.ec ; the Quito and Guayaquil dailies are also available here.

Culture
Loja is regarded as a seat of Ecuadorian culture. A local saying is: "The one who does not play the guitar can sing a song; the one who does not sing a song can write a verse; the one who does not write a verse reads a book."

Notable people
Isidro Ayora, President of Ecuador 1926–1931
Alejandro Carrión, writer and journalist
Benjamín Carrión, founder of the Ecuadorian "Casa de la Cultura" and writer
Clodoveo Carrión Mora, palaeontologist and naturalist
Matilde Hidalgo, physician, poet, and activist
Eduardo Kingman, artist
Bernardo Valdivieso, benefactor of Loja's universities and defender of religious principles
Christopher Velez, singer

Twin towns – sister cities
Loja is twinned with:
 Chiclayo, Peru
 La Huaca, Peru
 Santiago de Surco, Peru
 Vichayal, Peru

See also
Loja Province
Loja (canton)
Loja airport

References

https://web.archive.org/web/20141219035251/http://www.lojanos.com/ Lojanos.com - Virtual Community of Loja
 Guia de la Provincia de Loja, Ministerio de Turismo Ecuador, Quito, 2007
 Loja Para Todos, Camara de Turismo de la Provincia de Loja, Loja, 2007
 Historia Corta del Ciudad de Loja, various authors, UTPL, Loja, 2007

External links

Loja Area Map
Lojanos.com - Virtual community of Loja 
Official page of Loja municipality 

www.cronica.com.ec

Populated places in Loja Province
Populated places established in 1548
Provincial capitals in Ecuador
1548 establishments in the Spanish Empire